V. Athisayaraj Davidson (born 6 June 1992) is an Indian cricketer. He made his List A debut for Tamil Nadu in the 2018–19 Vijay Hazare Trophy on 3 October 2018.

References

External links
 

1992 births
Living people
Indian cricketers
Tamil Nadu cricketers
Place of birth missing (living people)